Andrew William Hankinson  (born December 22, 1983) is an American professional wrestler. He is currently signed to WWE, where he performs on the Raw brand under the ring name Luke Gallows and is a member of both the stables The O.C. and Bullet Club.

Hankinson began his career in 2005 and participated in that year's WWE Tough Enough, a contest created by WWE to find new prospects. Despite not winning the competition, he signed a development contract and was assigned to Deep South Wrestling, WWE's farm territory. In 2006, he started a feud with Kane, where Hankinson used Kane's old attire and mask, being called Imposter Kane. They faced each other at Vengeance where Hankinson was victorious. He was repackaged as Festus, a quiet man who turns insane when the bell rings. He teamed with Jesse for almost two years before the two were split. Following this, he went on a brief hiatus from television before reappearing as Luke Gallows, the enforcer and "disciple" of CM Punk in the Straight Edge Society. His first run ended in 2010.

After leaving WWE, he signed a contract with Total Nonstop Action Wrestling in 2011, where he became member of the villainous stable Aces & Eights under the ring name D.O.C. (Director of Chaos). He was  fired in 2013 and then signed a contract with the Japanese promotion New Japan Pro-Wrestling (NJPW) under the ring name Doc Gallows. He made his debut in the 2013 World Tag League as the partner of Karl Anderson, joining the Bullet Club faction. Gallows and Anderson won the Tag League and, during the following three years, they won the IWGP Tag Team Championship three times.

Gallows and Anderson would leave NJPW for WWE along with Bullet Club leader AJ Styles in 2016. Again as Luke Gallows, Gallows and Anderson would work as a tag team and, sometimes, as a stable with Styles known as The O.C. (The Original Club). They would win the WWE Raw Tag Team Championship twice, as well as the WWE Tag Team World Cup, a one night tournament between tag teams. They were released in 2020 due to the COVID-19 pandemic and, three months later, signed a contract with TNA, now called Impact Wrestling, where they won the Impact World Tag Team Championship in November. Their Impact contract expired in 2022 and that October, Gallows and Anderson returned to WWE and realigned with Styles as The O.C.

Professional wrestling career

Early career (2005)
Hankinson began his career in West Virginia with Mason-Dixon Wrestling and in Pennsylvania with the World Star Wrestling Federation (AWA/World Star Wrestling), Summit Wrestling Association of Southern Pennsylvania, and Maryland-based promotions National Wrestling League and the Eastern Wrestling Alliance, wrestling as Dorian Deville, and for West Virginia's Championship Pro Wrestling as the masked wrestler Dargon. He also played college Football at Fairmont State University.

World Wrestling Entertainment

Deep South Wrestling (2005–2007)
In April 2005, despite failing to make it as one of the final ten contestants on the $1,000,000 Tough Enough, he was signed to a contract by World Wrestling Entertainment (WWE) and was assigned to the Deep South Wrestling (DSW) developmental territory.

Hankinson wrestled in DSW as Dorian "Deacon" Deville before changing his ring name to The Freakin' Deacon. He adopted the gimmick of a deranged, facepaint-wearing wrestler who came to the ring with a pet spider named Willow, whom he sometimes spoke to. He formed a partnership with executive Palmer Cannon and his posterior associate Dalip Singh, helping Cannon to gain DSW's ownership and attack his enemies, but Palmer and Singh betrayed Deacon and stole his spider. He then formed an alliance with announcer and wrestler Bill DeMott, who was in a feud against The Gymini. The team proved to be effective, but Deacon abandoned DeMott during a match, causing him to be beaten down until other wrestlers made the save. It was later revealed that Quintin Michaels had captured Willow and used it to blackmail Deacon into leaving, but he later got his pet back, regaining his freedom.

Main roster debut (2006–2007) 
On May 29, 2006, Hankinson debuted on Raw as an imposter Kane. Wearing Kane's old mask and ring attire, he chokeslammed Kane during his match against Shelton Benjamin for the WWE Intercontinental Championship. Subsequently, Hankinson repeatedly attacked the real Kane during or after his matches. The pair finally faced off in a match at the Vengeance pay-per-view, with Hankinson winning using one of Kane's trademark moves. One night later, however, the storyline was abruptly ended when the original Kane attacked the Imposter Kane, removed his mask, and threw him out of the building.

Hankinson returned to Deep South Wrestling, in addition to appearing at SmackDown! house shows. In August, he got involved in a storyline with The Bag Lady, who acted as his valet and love interest. Though he got often distracted by her, she helped him to win matches. In October, Deacon and Bag Lady formed an alliance with The Major Brothers (Brian and Brett Major) against the team Urban Assault (Eric Perez, Sonny Siaki, Afa Anoa'i Jr. and G-Rilla), as their enforcer G-Rilla had clashed with Bag Lady earlier. In December 2006, Deacon defeated G-Rilla in a singles match, causing the rest of Urban Assault to turn on G-Rilla and beat him up. Deacon then aided G-Rilla and formed a tag team with him, helping him to get revenge on Urban Assault. The pair also feuded with Team Elite (Derrick Neikirk and Mike Knox) for the DSW Tag Team Championship. However, in March 2007 Deacon was beaten up with steel chairs by Neikirk and Knox and needed to be carried to the hospital by G-Rilla. There G-Rilla sat accidentally over Willow, which killed the spider and sent its owner into a mental breakdown.

Teaming with Jesse (2007–2009)

On the May 11, 2007, episode of SmackDown!, a vignette aired suggesting that Hankinson would be repackaged as Festus Dalton as part of a tag team using a Southern gimmick, alongside fellow WWE developmental talent Ray Gordy. On June 2, 2007, however, it was reported that WWE was dropping the "Dalton Boys" gimmick. The explanation for them not showing up on SmackDown was that they got lost on their way to the arena. Hankinson and Gordy had actually been sent to Ohio Valley Wrestling, where Hankinson changed his name to "Justice Dalton".

Hankinson was then renamed "Festus" while Gordy was dubbed "Jesse", and on the June 29, 2007, episode of SmackDown!, vignettes hyping Jesse and Festus began to air. For weeks, Jesse was presented as the mouth-piece of the tandem, who was in awe of his tag team partner. Hankinson, however, played a character that was mentally challenged and unresponsive. In spite of Festus' dimwitted nature, Jesse kept claiming that Festus was an emotionally driven and physically unstoppable giant. On the September 7, 2007, episode of SmackDown!, there was a segment featuring Jesse and Festus now actually in the arena rather than in a studio. On October 5, Hankinson won his debut match on SmackDown! with Jesse. When the opening bell rang, Festus' personality changed into a very focused and angry competitor as compared to the mentally disabled character he had portrayed. When the bell rang to signify the end of the match, Festus returned to his docile self. On the December 21 episode of SmackDown!, Festus defeated Deuce in a Santa Match, with both of them wearing Santa Claus outfits. On the January 25 episode of SmackDown, Jesse explained the reason that they had not been on television was because Festus has been seeing doctors about his "problems".

In 2008, before the bell rang, Jesse explained that Festus had changed. However, Festus did not change and continued to make a determined and monstrous face after the bell had rung. On the March 21 episode of SmackDown, Jesse and Festus had a chance to face John Morrison and The Miz for the WWE Tag Team Championship, but Morrison and The Miz retained the title. Festus received his first loss when he wrestled against World Heavyweight Champion The Undertaker on the April 11 episode of SmackDown, after passing out while in the Hell's Gate.

On April 15, 2009, Festus was drafted to the Raw brand as part of the 2009 Supplemental Draft and, as a result, was separated from his tag team partner Jesse, who remained on SmackDown.

Straight Edge Society (2009–2010)

After a three-month hiatus from television, Hankinson returned on the November 27, 2009, episode of SmackDown, repackaged as a villain under the name Luke Gallows, sporting a new attire along with a goatee, shaved head, and a considerably well built frame. After accompanying CM Punk to the ring for his match with Matt Hardy, Punk revealed that Gallows was actually Festus' true identity and claimed that Gallows' family and friends enabled his alcoholic inclination, which led to the mental state he was in as Festus, before stating that Gallows was cured due to Punk showing him the straight edge lifestyle. On the December 11 episode of SmackDown, Gallows and Punk defeated Hardy and R-Truth, after Gallows pinned Hardy with his new finishing move, the "Twelfth Step". On the January 8, 2010, episode of SmackDown, Gallows defeated Hardy. The next week, Gallows and Punk defeated Matt Hardy and The Great Khali, The Hart Dynasty, and Cryme Tyme in a fatal four-way match to become the number one contenders for the Unified WWE Tag Team Championship.

On the February 8 episode of Raw, The Straight Edge Society was eliminated in a Triple Threat elimination tag team match between them, The Miz and Big Show and DX for the Unified WWE Tag Team Championship. Miz and Big Show became the new Unified WWE Tag Team Champions. At WrestleMania XXVI Luke Gallows competed in a dark 30-man battle royal, which was won by Yoshi Tatsu. On the April 13 episode of NXT, he challenged CM Punk's rookie Darren Young and the stipulation, if Young lost, he would have had to surrender his hair to Punk and have it shaved bald. Gallows came close to getting the victory when Young came up with a roll-up and saved his hair, with Punk showing some favor to his rookie and Gallows seeming unhappy. At Extreme Rules, during Punk's Hair match against Rey Mysterio, Gallows and Serena helped Punk throughout the match until they were banned from ringside.

On the July 2 tapings of SmackDown, after a match between Luke Gallows and Kane, a security video was shown by Serena of her being caught drinking in a bar by Punk on the same day of The Undertaker's attack proving The Straight Edge Society's innocence in order to save Punk. Serena begged for forgiveness even after Punk warned her not to, but the Straight Edge Society simply left without her. The following week, however, Serena was forgiven by Punk for her actions, as they embraced, but Gallows did not approve. The following week Gallows was set to fight Big Show but gave the match to the SES Masked Man, who was unmasked as Joey Mercury during the match. On the September 3 episode of SmackDown, Gallows and Punk faced The Big Show in a two-on-one handicap match, which Gallows and Punk lost. After the match Punk delivered the GTS on Gallows.

On the September 16 episode of WWE Superstars, before a match with MVP, Gallows cut a promo announcing that he was no longer part of the Society by proclaiming he was his own man. Gallows went on to lose the match. On the September 24 episode of SmackDown, Gallows began a slow face turn when he confronted CM Punk in a backstage segment stating that after defeating him, he would have a beer, but lost a match to Punk later in the night.

Gallows, now officially established as a face, defeated Vance Archer on the November 4 airing of Superstars. His final television appearance was during a backstage segment in which Kane was looking for his father, on the November 19 episode of SmackDown. Hankinson was released from his WWE contract on the same day, along with several other superstars.

Independent circuit (2010–2016)
Hankinson wrestled on December 3, 2010, as "Keith Hanson", at an Inoki Genome Federation (IGF) event, where he defeated The Predator. On January 29, 2011, he lost to ECW Original Tommy Dreamer in a hardcore match at a National Wrestling Superstars (NWS) event in New Jersey. On March 25, 2011, Hankinson, working as Luke Gallows, made an appearance for the Japanese Apache Pro-Wrestling Army promotion, defeating Makoto Hashi. On May 29, 2011, Gallows debuted for NWA Rampage in Warner Robins, Georgia. Gallows defeated former Ring of Honor and TNA star by DQ after Rave's group, Jimmy Rave Approved, interfered. Afterwards an 8-man tag took place in which Gallows teamed with Kyle Matthews, J-Rod, & Frankie Valentine to defeat Rave, Sal Rinauro, Chip Day and Corey Hollis. On June 5 Gallows returned to NWA Rampage and lost to Heavyweight Champion Bull Buchanan. In August 2011, Hankinson and Cliff Compton traveled to wrestle in Nigeria. He was defeated by The Great Power Uti of Nigeria who took his belt.

Hankinson appeared on the World Wrestling Fan Xperience (WWFX) Champions Showcase Tour in Manila, Philippines on February 4, 2012, where he wrestled under the name Luke Gallow (using his heel S.E.S. gimmick) in a losing effort to Rhyno.
He also appeared at Wrestlerama in Georgetown, Guyana. On October 6, 2012, he was defeated by Scott Steiner in the House of Hardcore's first show. On September 22, 2012, Luke Gallows would debut for Dynamite Championship Wrestling at their Annual Breast Cancer Benefit Event. He won the American Pro Wrestling Alliance World Tag Team Championship in 2012 with Knux, but they were later stripped of the title, as they were made inactive, on March 1, 2013. From June 3 to 13, 2012, Hankinson, as Luke Gallows, worked a tour with the Japanese Pro Wrestling Noah promotion, during which he often teamed with Bobby Fish and Roderick Strong. He appeared for Pro Wrestling Syndicate on May 18, 2013, along with Knux and D'Lo Brown.
Hankinson made his last independent appearance on January 16, 2016, billed as Luke Gallows when he unsuccessfully challenged Chris Nelms in a Fatal 4-Way match for WrestleMerica Brass Knuckles Championship.

On May 6, 2015, Global Force Wrestling (GFW) announced Gallows as part of their roster. Gallows and Karl Anderson main evented the first-ever GFW show on June 12, defeating the New Heavenly Bodies (Dustin and Justin) in a tag team match.

Total Nonstop Action Wrestling (2011–2013)

On June 14, 2011, Hankinson wrestled a tryout dark match for Total Nonstop Action Wrestling (TNA), in which he was defeated by Gunner. In December 2011, Hankinson took part in TNA's India project, Ring Ka King, under the ring name "The Outlaw" Isaiah Cash. On June 21, 2012, Hankinson wrestled another tryout dark match for TNA.

Hankinson began working TNA house shows as a masked member of the Aces & Eights stable in September 2012. On September 4, Hankinson confirmed that he had signed a contract with the promotion. at Bound for Glory, Hankinson and Knux (still masked) defeated Bully Ray and Sting to gain full access to the Impact Zone. Hankinson was unmasked and revealed as a member of the Aces & Eights on the November 1 episode of Impact Wrestling. The following week, Hankinson, billed as D.O.C. (Director of Chaos), teamed with stablemate Devon in a tag team match, where they were defeated by Kurt Angle and Sting via disqualification. Having been told to show why he deserved a spot in Aces & Eights, D.O.C. afterwards put Sting through a table, before beating him with a ball-peen hammer. DOC made his TNA pay-per-view debut three days later at Turning Point, defeating Joseph Park in a singles match. On the December 6 episode of Impact Wrestling, D.O.C. was defeated by Kurt Angle which ended By disqualification when Aces & Eights attacked Angle.

On December 9 at Final Resolution, D.O.C. teamed with Devon and two masked members of Aces & Eights in a losing effort to Kurt Angle, Garett Bischoff, Samoa Joe, and Wes Brisco. on the December 13 episode of Impact Wrestling, D.O.C. and a masked man (members of Aces and 8's) lost to James Storm and Jeff Hardy. At Genesis, D.O.C. was defeated by Sting in a singles match. On the February 7 episode of Impact Wrestling, D.O.C. and Devon were defeated by Bully Ray and Sting in a Tables match. On the February 21 episode of Impact Wrestling, Aces & Eights, consisting of D.O.C., Devon and Mr. Anderson defeated Sting, Hulk Hogan and Bully Ray in a six-man tag team match after they took Hogan out before the match. At Lockdown, Aces & Eights, consisting of D.O.C., Devon, Garett Bischoff, Knux, and Mr. Anderson were defeated by Team TNA, consisting of Eric Young, James Storm, Magnus, Samoa Joe, and Sting in a Lethal Lockdown match. On the March 18 episode of TNA Xplosion, D.O.C. lost to James Storm. At Hardcore Justice 2, Aces & Eights (D.O.C., Wes Brisco and Knux) lost to James Storm, Magnus and Bob Holly in a Six-Man Hardcore Elimination tag team match. At World Cup, D.O.C. a part of Team Aces & Eights started off when D.O.C and Knux defeated Team International's Funaki and Petey Williams later that night Team Aces & Eights lost a Five-on-Five Elimination Tag Team match to Team USA (Christopher Daniels, James Storm, Kazarian, Kenny King and Mickie James) failing to win the cup. on the April 4 episode of Impact Wrestling, Aces and 8s (D.O.C., Devon, Knux, Wes Brisco and Garett Bischoff) defeated Kurt Angle, Eric Young, Samoa Joe, Magnus and Joseph Park in a ten-man tag team match. On the May 9 episode of Impact, D.O.C. lost a match to Magnus. At Slammiversary XI, D.O.C. and other members of the Aces and 8s helped Bully Ray defeat Sting in a No Holds Barred match to retain the TNA World Heavyweight Championship. On the June 13 episode of Impact, D.O.C. participated in an Aces & Eights battle royal match for a spot in the 2013 Bound for Glory Series, but ended up being thrown out by Mr. Anderson after refusing to get out of the ring, though not turning face.  On the July 11 episode of Impact Wrestling, D.O.C. lost his bid to become the vice president of Aces and Eights as Knux gave his deciding vote to Mr. Anderson, to D.O.C.'s disgust. On July 12, Hankinson's contract expired. Four days later, he announced he and TNA had officially parted ways. His departure was explained on screen as having turned in his kutte after losing the bid of Vice President to Mr. Anderson.

New Japan Pro-Wrestling (2013–2016)

On November 11, 2013, New Japan Pro-Wrestling announced Hankinson as a participant in the 2013 World Tag League, where he would be teaming with Karl Anderson as part of Bullet Club, thus establishing himself as a heel. Hankinson made his New Japan debut under the name Doc Gallows on November 23, when he and Anderson defeated Bushi and Kota Ibushi in a non-tournament match, with Gallows pinning Bushi for the win. In the round-robin portion of the tournament, which ran from November 24 to December 7, Gallows and Anderson finished with a record of four wins and two losses, winning their block and advancing to the semi-finals. On December 8, Gallows and Anderson first defeated G.B.H. (Togi Makabe and Tomoaki Honma) in the semi-finals and then Tencozy (Hiroyoshi Tenzan and Satoshi Kojima) in the finals to win the 2013 World Tag League and earn a shot at the IWGP Tag Team Championship. Gallows returned to New Japan on January 4, 2014, at Wrestle Kingdom 8 in Tokyo Dome, where he and Anderson defeated K.E.S. (Davey Boy Smith Jr. and Lance Archer) to become the new IWGP Tag Team Champions.

Gallows and Anderson made their first successful title defense on February 9 at The New Beginning in Hiroshima, defeating K.E.S. in a rematch. Their second defense took place on April 6 at Invasion Attack 2014, where they defeated Hirooki Goto and Katsuyori Shibata. Gallows and Anderson's third successful defense took place just seven days later, during New Japan's trip to Taiwan, when they defeated Hirooki Goto and Captain Taiwan. On May 17, Gallows and Anderson made their fourth successful title defense against The Briscoes (Jay and Mark) at a NJPW and Ring of Honor (ROH) co-produced event, War of the Worlds, in New York City. On June 21 at Dominion 6.21, Gallows and Anderson made their fifth successful defense against Ace to King (Hiroshi Tanahashi and Togi Makabe). From July 21 to August 8, Gallows took part in the 2014 G1 Climax, where he finished ninth out of the eleven wrestlers in his block with a record of four wins and six losses. On September 21 at Destruction in Kobe, Gallows and Anderson made their sixth successful title defense against Kazuchika Okada and Yoshi-Hashi. In December, Gallows and Anderson made it to the finals of the 2014 World Tag League, after winning their block with a record of five wins and two losses. On December 7, Gallows and Anderson were defeated in the finals of the tournament by Hirooki Goto and Katsuyori Shibata. Gallows and Anderson's year-long reign as the IWGP Tag Team Champions came to an end on January 4, 2015, at Wrestle Kingdom 9 in Tokyo Dome, where they were defeated by Goto and Shibata.

Gallows and Anderson regained the title from Goto and Shibata on February 11 at The New Beginning in Osaka. They lost the title to The Kingdom (Matt Taven and Michael Bennett) on April 5 at Invasion Attack 2015. They regained the title from The Kingdom on July 5 at Dominion 7.5 in Osaka-jo Hall. From July 20 to August 14, Gallows took part in the 2015 G1 Climax, where he finished last in his block with a record of three wins and six losses. On January 4, 2016, at Wrestle Kingdom 10 in Tokyo Dome, Gallows and Anderson lost the IWGP Tag Team Championship to Togi Makabe and Tomoaki Honma. Hours after the event, it was reported that both Gallows and Anderson had given their notice to NJPW on the morning of January 4, announcing that they were leaving the promotion for WWE. TNA later claimed that Gallows had agreed to return to the promotion, along with Anderson and AJ Styles, before the trio broke off communication with TNA over the Christmas holiday. Though not under contract, Gallows was expected to honor previously booked dates through February. On February 14 at The New Beginning in Niigata, Gallows and Anderson received a rematch for the IWGP Tag Team Championship, but were again defeated by Makabe and Honma. On February 20, Gallows and Anderson wrestled their final NJPW match, where they teamed with Bullet Club stablemates Bad Luck Fale and Tama Tonga, losing to Bobby Fish, Hirooki Goto, Katsuyori Shibata, and Kyle O'Reilly in an eight-man tag team match.

Return to WWE (2016–2020)

Tag team championship pursuits (2016–2019)

On the April 11, 2016, episode of Raw, Gallows and Karl Anderson (with Gallows reverting to his former WWE ring name, Luke Gallows) made their debut, attacking The Usos, thus establishing themselves as heels. On the April 18 episode of Raw, Gallows and Anderson attacked WWE World Heavyweight Champion Roman Reigns, following Reigns' promo with AJ Styles. During this time, Gallows and Anderson helped Styles in his feud with Reigns, with Styles at first reluctant for their help. Gallows and Anderson wrestled their first WWE match on the April 25 episode of Raw, defeating The Usos. On the May 30 episode of Raw, Styles would confront a returning John Cena who said the "new era" would have to go through him, before offering Styles his hand. Styles shook his hand, shortly before Gallows and Anderson interrupted. As Styles and Cena appeared ready to fight Gallows and Anderson, Styles instead beat down Cena repeatedly, reuniting The club.

On July 19, as part of WWE draft, both Gallows and Karl Anderson were drafted to Raw, while AJ Styles was drafted to SmackDown, splitting up The club. On July 24 at Battleground, The Club wrestled together for the final time, in a loss to Cena and Enzo and Cass. Gallows and Anderson then dropped Styles from the group and resumed feuding with The New Day, leading up to a SummerSlam match for the WWE Tag Team Championship, which they won by disqualification because of show guest Jon Stewart and a returning Big E getting involved. At Clash of Champions, Gallows and Anderson failed to win the titles. In November, Gallows and Anderson were announced as part of Team Raw for the 10–on–10 Survivor Series Tag Team Elimination match at Survivor Series, which they won. On the January 18, 2017 episode of Raw, Gallows and Anderson appeared to defeat Cesaro and Sheamus by pinfall for the Raw Tag Team Championship; however, due to Sheamus having hit the referee, the decision was reversed to a disqualification, leading to them winning the match but not the title. On the Royal Rumble preshow, Gallows and Anderson defeated Cesaro and Sheamus to win the Raw Tag Team Championship for the first time. They lost the title to the returning  Hardy Boyz at WrestleMania 33 in a fatal four-way tag team ladder match. At the Payback kick-off show on April 30, Gallows and Anderson lost to Enzo and Cass. For the rest of 2017, Gallows and Anderson were mostly off television, only appearing sporadically on Raw and mainly being relegated to Main Event.

On the January 1, 2018 Raw, the duo turned face, in effect this marked Gallows' face turn for the first time since 2010, by appearing as former Bullet Club stablemate Finn Bálor's surprise tag team partners. After a brief feud, they lost to The Revival at the Royal Rumble pre-show. At WrestleMania 34 on April 8, Anderson and Gallows competed in the André the Giant Memorial Battle Royal, but did not win. On April 17, Gallows and Anderson were both drafted to SmackDown as part of Superstar Shake-up. On the May 22 episode of SmackDown, Gallows and Anderson defeated The Usos to become number one contenders for the SmackDown Tag Team Championship, but they failed to win the title from The Bludgeon Brothers on the Money in the Bank pre-show and also lost a rematch on the June 19 episode of SmackDown. At WrestleMania 35 in April 2019, Anderson and Gallows wrestled in their second André the Giant Memorial Battle Royal, but again did not win.

The O.C. (2019–2020)

On the April 29 episode of Raw, Gallows and Anderson returned to the Raw brand, losing to The Usos. As of that match, they had not won a match on television since they defeated The Usos in May 2018.

In July 2019, it was reported that Gallows and Anderson had re-signed with WWE to five-year contracts. After he lost a United States Championship match to Ricochet, Gallows and Anderson helped Styles attack Ricochet, and reuniting The club as heels. On the July 22 episode of Raw, The club was renamed The O.C., which means "Original Club". On the July 29 episode of Raw, Gallows and Anderson became two-time Raw Tag Team Champions by defeating The Revival and The Usos in a triple threat tag team match. They held the titles for a mere three weeks before losing them to Seth Rollins and Braun Strowman.

At Crown Jewel, Gallows and Anderson defeated eight other teams to win the WWE Tag Team World Cup. Gallows competed in the men's Royal Rumble match at the namesake pay-per-view, entering at No. 24 before being eliminated by Edge. He and Anderson appeared at WrestleMania 36 during Styles' Boneyard match against The Undertaker.

On April 15, 2020, Gallows (along with Anderson) was released from his WWE contract as part of budget cuts stemming from the COVID-19 pandemic.

Return to Impact Wrestling (2020–2022) 
On July 18, 2020, Gallows and Anderson announced that they had signed two-year contracts with Impact Wrestling (formerly TNA) and would be appearing at Slammiversary. At the event, Gallows (reverting to his Doc Gallows in ring name) and Anderson, now known as The Good Brothers, appeared at the end of the show helping Eddie Edwards fend off Ace Austin and Madman Fulton before celebrating with Edwards, establishing themselves as fan favorites in the process. At Bound for Glory, Gallows and Anderson competed in a Four-way tag team match for the Impact World Tag Team Championship which was won by The North. At Turning Point (2020), Gallows and Anderson defeated The North to win the Impact World Tag Team Championship for the first time. On the December 16 episode of Impact Wrestling, Anderson pinned Chris Sabin by rolling Sabin up while pulling on Sabin's shorts for leverage. When Impact World Champion Rich Swann confronted Anderson about it, Anderson attacked him, turning heel in the process. Sabin and Alex Shelley then attacked Anderson but Gallows returned from injury and kicked Shelley in the head, turning heel as well. Anderson, Gallows and Kenny Omega laid out Swann and the MCMG and then reunited Bullet Club.

On the February 19, 2022 at No Surrender, The Good Brothers rejoined the Bullet Club.

All Elite Wrestling (2021)
Gallows with Anderson as The Good Brothers made their AEW debut at the end of AEW Dynamite New Year's Smash Night 1, saving Kenny Omega from Jon Moxley and making the "Too Sweet" hand gesture along with Omega and The Young Bucks. Gallows and Anderson were making appearances in AEW, due to a working relationship crossover deal with Impact Wrestling.

Return to New Japan Pro-Wrestling (2021)
In June 2021, it was announced that Gallows along with Anderson would be returning to New Japan Pro Wrestling for the first time since early 2016 as part of the United States-based show NJPW Strong and would compete in its Tag Team Turbulence tournament.

Second return to WWE (2022–present)
On the October 10, 2022, episode of Raw, Gallows and Anderson made their unannounced return to WWE as faces, saving AJ Styles from an attack by The Judgment Day after Styles fooled Finn Bálor into thinking he had joined them by embracing in a hug.
This marked Gallows’ third run with the WWE. The O.C decided to take the Judgment Day on at Crown Jewel on November 5, 2022. The team ended up with a loss because of Rhea Ripley. After the loss because of the interference , WWE superstar Mia Yim decided to join The O.C and help them fend off Ripley.

Other media
Gallows and Karl Anderson along with fellow wrestler Rocky Romero run a podcast named Talk'N Shop.

Video games

Championships and accomplishments

American Pro Wrestling Alliance
APWA World Tag Team Championship (1 time) – with Knux
Impact Wrestling
 Impact World Tag Team Championship (3 times) – with Karl Anderson
 Impact Year End Awards (3 times)
 Finishing Move of the Year (2020) – Magic Killer 
 Moment of the Year (2020) – 
 Tag Team of the Year (2021) – with Karl Anderson
 Lariato Pro Wrestling
 Lariato Pro Tag Team Championship (1 time, current) – with Karl Anderson
National Wrestling Alliance
NWA Southern Tag Team Championship (1 time) – with Iceberg
National Wrestling League
NWL Heavyweight Championship (1 time)
New Japan Pro-Wrestling
IWGP Tag Team Championship (3 times) – with Karl Anderson
World Tag League (2013) – with Karl Anderson
NJPW Strong Tag Team Turbulence Tournament (2021) – with Karl Anderson
 Rampage Pro Wrestling
RPW Heavyweight Championship (1 time)
Pro Wrestling Illustrated
Ranked No. 65 of the top 500 wrestlers in the PWI 500 in 2016
River City Wrestling
RCW Tag Team Championship (1 time) – with Knux
Southern Fried Championship Wrestling
SFCW Heavyweight Championship (1 time)
Vanguard Championship Wrestling
VCW Heavyweight Championship (1 time)
Wrestling Observer Newsletter
Worst Gimmick (2012, 2013) 
WWE
WWE Raw Tag Team Championship (2 times) – with Karl Anderson
WWE Tag Team World Cup (2019) – with Karl Anderson
 Other titles
 Talk 'N Shop A Mania 24/7 Championship (1 time)

References

External links

 

1983 births
Aces & Eights members
American male professional wrestlers
Bullet Club members
Expatriate professional wrestlers in Japan
Fictional impostors
Living people
Professional wrestlers from Maryland
TNA/Impact World Tag Team Champions
21st-century professional wrestlers
IWGP Heavyweight Tag Team Champions